Ivo Ćipiko (13 January 1869 in Kaštel Novi – 23 September 1923 in Kaštel Novi) was a Serbian writer, primarily a novelist. Ćipiko, like Simo Matavulj before him, presented a picture of the South Adriatic that was not always sunny or blue.

Biography
Ivo Ćipiko was born on 13 January 1869 in Kaštel Novi, on the estate of his forefathers who came from Italy in the Middle Ages and settled along the Dalmatian coast. Ćipiko's ancestors are believed to have been of Italian origin and Roman Catholics. Baptized in the Roman Catholic faith, Ivo Ćipiko identified himself more with the Serbian nation, and was careful to avoid uncritical approbation of the Dalmatian Croats and their Latin church. Early in his education he came under the influence of Serbian literature, then popularized by the Serb-Catholic circle.

Ćipiko graduated from a forestry school in 1890 and worked as a forestry officer in Brač, Makarska, Hvar and Kotor until 1909. He then came to live in Serbia and devote himself to literary pursuits. During the Balkan Wars of 1912–13 he was a military correspondent attached to the Serbian Army Headquarters. After the war, Ćipiko became one of the most ardent proponent of Jovan Skerlić's unitarian ideas along with other Serbian writers from Croatia, Dalmatia, Montenegro, and Bosnia and Herzegovina, such as Mirko Korolija, Niko Pucić, Svetozar Ćorović and Aleksa Šantić.

Ćipiko died at Kaštel Novi on his family's estate on 23 September 1923.

Works
Serbian fiction of the time, denoted as lyrical realism by literary critic Jovan Skerlić, relied upon the previous tradition, but it also cleared the way for later modern fiction. The sense of alarm concerning the deterioration of social conditions present in Ivo Ćipiko's best work, the 1909 novel Pauci (The Spiders), had a lot to do with it.

In his short-story collections, such as "Seaside Souls" (1899) and "By the Sea" (1911), the novel "For Bread" (1904), and the drama "On the Border" (1910), Ćipiko depicted the life of Dalmatian peasants and their struggles with moneylenders, landowners, and Austrian bureaucrats. He introduced the figure of the peasant rebel into Serbian literature in the novel "Spiders" (1909). His search for moral ideals was expressed in his poetization of the "natural man," who resists the hypocrisy of bourgeois society. He used realist narrative techniques but playfully embellished them by focusing mainly on the protagonist's inner life.  Ćipiko's notes and diaries from the front, "Impressions of the War of 1912" (1914) and "From the Days of War" (1917), are marked by a spirit of antimilitarism.

Ivo  has "poems in prose" in which the narrative element is totally subordinated to lyricism, the evolution of mood, the expression of emotions and passions, and to language and style in Ceznja (Longing, 1898). The same kind of lyrical prose was produced by the eight years younger Isidora Sekulić in Bure (Gusts).

Bibliography
 Iz ratnih dana, Corfu, 1917.
 Iz solunskih borbi, Belgrade, 1919.
 Kraj mora (short stories), Dubrovnik, 1911.
 Na granici, (drama), 1910.
 Na pomolu, Thessaloniki, 1916.
 Na povratku s rada, (short stories)
 Pauci (novel), Belgrade, 1909.
 Preljub (short stories), Belgrade, 1914.
 Primorske duše (short stories), Zagreb, 1899.
 Sa jadranskih obala (short stories), Mostar, 1900. 
 Sa ostrva (short stories), Belgrade, 1903.
 Utisci iz rata 1912, Sarajevo, 1914.
 Volja naroda (drama), 1911.
 Za kruhom (novel), Novi Sad, 1904.

References

 From Serbian Wikipedia: Иво Ћипико
 Jovan Skerlić, Istorija nove srpske knjizevnosti (Belgrade, 1921), pages 469-471.
 Gligorić, V. "I. Ćipiko". In his book Srpski realisti, 5th ed., Belgrade, 1968.

1869 births
1923 deaths
Serbian writers